In organic chemistry, cyanocarbons are a group of chemical compounds that contain several cyanide functional groups. Such substances generally are classified as organic compounds, since they are formally derived from hydrocarbons by replacing one or more hydrogen atoms with a cyanide group. Organic chemists often refer to cyanides as nitriles.

In general, cyanide is an electronegative substituent. Thus, for example, cyanide-substituted carboxylic acids tend to be stronger than the parents. The cyanide group can also stabilize anions by delocalizing negative charge as revealed by resonance structures.

Definition and examples
Cyanocarbons are organic compounds bearing enough cyano functional groups to significantly alter their chemical properties.

Illustrative cyanocarbons:
 Tetracyanoethylene, which reduces to a stable anion, unlike most derivatives of ethylene.
 Pentacyanocyclopentadiene, which forms an air-stable anion, in contrast to cyclopentadiene.
 Tetracyanoethylene oxide, an electrophilic epoxide that undergoes ready scission of its C-C bond.
 Tetracyanoquinodimethane, C6H4-1,4-(C(CN)2)2, which reduces to a stable anion, unlike most quinones.
 Cyanoform (tricyanomethane), (NC)3CH
 Pentacyanopropenide, [(NC)2C-C(CN)-C(CN)2]−.

References

Nitriles